Trance X is an X Japan remix album released on December 4, 2002. The remixes were done by several DJs. It reached number 27 on the Oricon chart.

Track listing 
 "Silent Jealousy (Phil Reynolds and Steve Blake Remix)" - 6:49
 "Kurenai (Taka & MOZ Mix Edit)" - 5:28
 "Scars (Nuw Idols "Scars to Enlightenment Mix")" - 7:08
 "Art of Life (Stephane K Remix)" - 8:02
 "Dahlia (Umek "Recycled" Mix)" - 5:32
 "Rusty Nail (Oliver Ho Remix)" - 4:01
 "Tears (Valentino Kanzyani's Breakbeat Mix)" - 5:15
 "Crucify My Love (Mr. Bishi Remix)" - 5:37
 "Longing (JK Theory "Hard Trace" Remix)" - 5:51
 "Standing Sex (WM Ptamigan Remix)" - 5:57
 "Endless Rain (DJ Tokunaga Remix)" - 9:19

References 

X Japan albums
2002 remix albums
Polydor Records remix albums
Trance remix albums